Chromasex Monkeydrive is the fourth studio album by LUXT, released on April 18, 2000 by Chalkhead Records. Vocalist Anna Christine recommended the album highly among the artist's other work and described it as an enjoyable listen.

Track listing

Personnel
Adapted from the Chromasex Monkeydrive liner notes.

LUXT
 Anna Christine – bass guitar, keyboards, sampler, vocals, executive-producer
 Crash – bass guitar
 David Hiscook – guitar
 Erie Loch – guitar, keyboards, sampler, vocals, production, engineering
 Frost Reed – drums

Additional performers
 Dik – electronics

Release history

References

External links 
 Chromasex Monkeydrive at iTunes
 Chromasex Monkeydrive at Discogs (list of releases)

2000 albums
LUXT albums